Spain, or the Kingdom of Spain, is a country primarily located in southwestern Europe with parts of territory in the Atlantic Ocean and across the Mediterranean Sea. The largest part of Spain is situated on the Iberian Peninsula; its territory also includes the Canary Islands in the Atlantic Ocean, the Balearic Islands in the Mediterranean Sea, and the autonomous cities of Ceuta and Melilla in Africa. The country's mainland is bordered to the south by Gibraltar; to the south and east by the Mediterranean Sea; to the north by France, Andorra and the Bay of Biscay; and to the west by Portugal and the Atlantic Ocean. Spain's capital and largest city is Madrid; other major urban areas include Barcelona, Valencia, Seville, Zaragoza, Málaga, Murcia, Palma de Mallorca, Las Palmas de Gran Canaria, and Bilbao.

Anatomically modern humans first arrived in the Iberian Peninsula around 42,000 years ago. The ancient Iberian and Celtic tribes, along with other local pre-Roman peoples, dwelled the territory maintaining contacts with foreign Mediterranean cultures. The Roman conquest and colonization of the peninsula (Hispania) ensued, bringing the Romanization of the population. Receding of Western Roman imperial authority ushered in the migration into Iberia of tribes from Central and Northern Europe with the Visigoths as the dominant power in the peninsula by the fifth century. In the early eighth century, most of the peninsula was conquered by the Umayyad Caliphate, and during early Islamic rule, Al-Andalus became a dominant peninsular power centered in Córdoba. Several Christian kingdoms emerged in Northern Iberia, chief among them León, Castile, Aragon, Portugal, and Navarre made an intermittent southward military expansion, known as Reconquista, repelling the Islamic rule in Iberia, which culminated with the Christian seizure of the Emirate of Granada in 1492. Jews and Muslims were forced to choose between conversion to Catholicism or expulsion, and eventually the converts were expelled through different royal decrees.

The dynastic union of the Crown of Castile and the Crown of Aragon in 1479, often considered the formation of Spain as a country, was followed by the annexation of Navarre and the incorporation of Portugal during the Iberian Union. A major country of the Age of Discovery, Spain began the colonization of the New World in 1492 developing one of the largest empires in history and underpinned the emergence of a global trading system primarily fuelled by precious metals. Centralisation and further state-building in mainland Spain ensued in the 18th century with the Bourbon reforms. In the 19th century the Crown saw the independence of its American colonies as a result of cumulative crises and political divisions after the Peninsular War. Political instability reached its peak in the 20th century with the Spanish Civil War, giving rise to the Francoist dictatorship that lasted until 1975. With the restoration of democracy under the Constitution of Spain and the entry into the European Union, the country experienced profound economic, political and social change.

The so-called Siglo de Oro was a period of flourishing in arts and literature in Spain, coinciding with the political rise of the Spanish Empire under the Catholic Monarchs and the Spanish Habsburgs. As such, Spanish art, music, literature and cuisine have been influential worldwide, particularly in Western Europe and the Americas. As a reflection of its large cultural wealth, Spain has one of the world's largest numbers of World Heritage Sites and is the world's second-most visited country. Its cultural influence extends over 570 million Hispanophones, making Spanish language the world's second-most spoken native language and the world's most widely spoken Romance language.

Spain is a highly developed country ranked 27th in the Human Development Index, a secular parliamentary democracy and a constitutional monarchy, with King Felipe VI as head of state. It is a high-income country and an advanced economy, with the world's sixteenth-largest economy by nominal GDP and the sixteenth-largest by PPP. Spain has the twelfth-highest life expectancy in the world. It ranks particularly high in healthcare quality, with its healthcare system considered to be one of the most efficient worldwide. It is a world leader in organ transplants and organ donation. Spain is a member of the United Nations, the European Union, the Eurozone, the Council of Europe (CoE), de facto member of the G20, the Organization of Ibero-American States (OEI), the Union for the Mediterranean, the North Atlantic Treaty Organization (NATO), the Organisation for Economic Co-operation and Development (OECD), Organization for Security and Co-operation in Europe (OSCE), the World Trade Organization (WTO),  and many other international organisations.

Etymology  
The name of Spain (España) comes from Hispania, the name used by the Romans for the Iberian Peninsula and its provinces during the Roman Empire. The etymological origin of the term Hispania is uncertain, although the Phoenicians referred to the region as Spania, therefore the most widely accepted etymology is a Phoenician one. There have been a number of accounts and hypotheses of its origin:

The Renaissance scholar Antonio de Nebrija proposed that the word Hispania evolved from the Iberian word , meaning "city of the western world".

 argued that the root of the term span is the Phoenician word , meaning "to forge metals". Therefore, i-spn-ya would mean "the land where metals are forged". It may be a derivation of the Phoenician , meaning "island of rabbits", "land of rabbits" or "edge", a reference to Spain's location at the end of the Mediterranean; Roman coins struck in the region from the reign of Hadrian show a female figure with a rabbit at her feet, and Strabo called it the "land of the rabbits". The word in question (compare modern Hebrew) actually means "Hyrax", possibly due to Phoenicians confusing the two animals.

There is the claim that "Hispania" derives from the Basque word  meaning "edge" or "border", another reference to the fact that the Iberian Peninsula constitutes the southwest corner of the European continent.

Two 15th-century Spanish Jewish scholars, Don Isaac Abrabanel and Solomon ibn Verga, gave an explanation now considered folkloric: both men wrote in two different published works that the first Jews to reach Spain were brought by ship by Phiros who was confederate with the king of Babylon when he laid siege to Jerusalem. Phiros was a Grecian by birth, but who had been given a kingdom in Spain. Phiros became related by marriage to Espan, the nephew of king Heracles, who also ruled over a kingdom in Spain. Heracles later renounced his throne in preference for his native Greece, leaving his kingdom to his nephew, Espan, from whom the country of España (Spain) took its name.

History

Prehistory and pre-Roman peoples 

Archaeological research at Atapuerca indicates the Iberian Peninsula was populated by hominids 1.2 million years ago. In Atapuerca fossils have been found of the earliest known hominins in Europe, Homo antecessor. Modern humans first arrived in Iberia, from the north on foot, about 35,000 years ago. The best known artefacts of these prehistoric human settlements are the famous paintings in the Altamira cave of Cantabria in northern Iberia, which were created from 35,600 to 13,500 BCE by Cro-Magnon. Archaeological and genetic evidence suggests that the Iberian Peninsula acted as one of several major refugia from which northern Europe was repopulated following the end of the last ice age.

The largest groups inhabiting the Iberian Peninsula before the Roman conquest were the Iberians and the Celts. The Iberians inhabited the Mediterranean side of the peninsula, from the northeast to the southeast. The Celts inhabited much of the interior and Atlantic side of the peninsula, from the northwest to the southwest. Basques occupied the western area of the Pyrenees mountain range and adjacent areas, the Phoenician-influenced Tartessians culture flourished in the southwest and the Lusitanians and Vettones occupied areas in the central west. Several cities were founded along the coast by Phoenicians, and trading outposts and colonies were established by Greeks in the East. Eventually, Phoenician-Carthaginians expanded inland towards the meseta; however, due to the bellicose inland tribes, the Carthaginians got settled in the coasts of the Iberian Peninsula.

Roman Hispania and the Visigothic Kingdom 

During the Second Punic War, roughly between 210 and 205 BCE the expanding Roman Republic captured Carthaginian trading colonies along the Mediterranean coast. Although it took the Romans nearly two centuries to complete the conquest of the Iberian Peninsula, they retained control of it for over six centuries. Roman rule was bound together by law, language, and the Roman road.

The cultures of the pre-Roman populations were gradually Romanised (Latinised) at different rates depending on what part of the peninsula they lived in, with local leaders being admitted into the Roman aristocratic class. Hispania served as a granary for the Roman market, and its harbours exported gold, wool, olive oil, and wine. Agricultural production increased with the introduction of irrigation projects, some of which remain in use. Emperors Hadrian, Trajan, Theodosius I, and the philosopher Seneca were born in Hispania. Christianity was introduced into Hispania in the 1st century CE and it became popular in the cities in the 2nd century CE. Most of Spain's present languages and religion, and the basis of its laws, originate from this period. In the late 2nd century (starting in 170 CE) incursions of North-African Mauri in the province of Baetica took place.

The Germanic Suebi and Vandals, together with the Sarmatian Alans entered the peninsula after 409, henceforth weakening the Western Roman Empire's jurisdiction over Hispania. These tribes had crossed the Rhine in early 407 and ravaged Gaul. The Suebi established a kingdom in north-western Iberia whereas the Vandals established themselves in the south of the peninsula by 420 before crossing over to North Africa in 429. As the western empire disintegrated, the social and economic base became greatly simplified: but even in modified form, the successor regimes maintained many of the institutions and laws of the late empire, including Christianity and assimilation to the evolving Roman culture.

The Byzantines established an occidental province, Spania, in the south, with the intention of reviving Roman rule throughout Iberia. Eventually, however, Hispania was reunited under Visigothic rule. These Visigoths, or Western Goths, after sacking Rome under the leadership of Alaric (410 CE), turned towards the Iberian Peninsula, with Athaulf as their leader, and occupied the northeastern portion. Wallia extended his rule over most of the peninsula, confining the Suebians to Galicia. Theodoric I took part, with the Romans and Franks, in the Battle of the Catalaunian Plains, where Attila was routed. Euric (466 CE), who put an end to the last remnants of Roman power in the peninsula, may be considered the first monarch of Spain, though the Suebians still maintained their independence in Galicia. Euric was also the first king to give written laws to the Visigoths. In the following reigns the Catholic kings of France assumed the role of protectors of the Hispano-Roman Catholics against the Arianism of the Visigoths, and in the wars which ensued Alaric II and Amalaric died.

Athanagild, having risen against King Agila, called in the Byzantines and, in payment for the support they gave him, ceded to them the maritime places of the southeast (554 CE). Liuvigild restored the political unity of the peninsula, subduing the Suebians, but the religious divisions of the country, reaching even the royal family, brought on a civil war. St. Hermengild, the king's son, putting himself at the head of the Catholics, was defeated and taken prisoner, and suffered martyrdom for rejecting communion with the Arians. Reccared, son of Liuvigild and brother of St. Hermengild, added religious unity to the political unity achieved by his father, accepting the Catholic faith in the Third Council of Toledo (589 CE). The religious unity established by this council was the basis of that fusion of Goths with Hispano-Romans which produced the Spanish nation. Sisebut and Suintila completed the expulsion of the Byzantines from Spain.

Intermarriage between Visigoths and Hispano-Romans was prohibited, though in practice it could not be entirely prevented and was eventually legalised by Liuvigild. The Spanish-Gothic scholars such as Braulio of Zaragoza and Isidore of Seville played an important role in keeping the classical Greek and Roman culture. Isidore was one of the most influential clerics and philosophers in the Middle Ages in Europe, and his theories were also vital to the conversion of the Visigothic Kingdom from an Arian domain to a Catholic one in the Councils of Toledo. Isidore created the first western encyclopedia which had a huge impact during the Middle Ages.

Muslim era and Reconquista 

From 711 to 718, as part of the expansion of the Umayyad Caliphate, which had conquered North Africa from the Byzantine Empire, nearly all of the Iberian Peninsula was conquered by Muslim armies from across the Strait of Gibraltar, resulting in the collapse of the Visigothic Kingdom. Only a small area in the mountainous north of the peninsula stood out of the territory seized during the initial invasion. The Kingdom of Asturias-León consolidated upon this pocket of territory. Other Christian kingdoms such as Navarre and Aragon in the mountainous north eventually surged upon the consolidation of counties of the Carolingian Marca Hispanica. For several centuries, the fluctuating frontier between the Muslim and Christian controlled areas of the peninsula was along the Ebro and Douro valleys.

Under Islamic law, Christians and Jews were given the subordinate status of dhimmi. This status permitted Christians and Jews to practice their religions as People of the Book but they were required to pay a special tax and had legal and social rights inferior to those of Muslims.

Conversion to Islam proceeded at an increasing pace. The muladíes (Muslims of ethnic Iberian origin) are believed to have formed the majority of the population of Al-Andalus by the end of the 10th century.

The Muslim society was itself diverse and beset by social tensions. The North-African Berber peoples, who had provided the bulk of the invading armies, clashed with the Arab leadership from the Middle East. Over time, large Moorish populations became established, especially in the Guadalquivir River valley, the coastal plain of Valencia, the Ebro River valley and (towards the end of this period) in the mountainous region of Granada.

A series of Viking incursions raided the coasts of the Iberian Peninsula in the 9th and 10th centuries. The first recorded Viking raid on Iberia took place in 844; it ended in failure with many Vikings killed by the Galicians' ballistas; and seventy of the Vikings' longships captured on the beach and burned by the troops of King Ramiro I of Asturias.

Córdoba, the capital of the caliphate since Abd-ar-Rahman III, was the largest, richest and most sophisticated city in western Europe. Mediterranean trade and cultural exchange flourished. Muslims imported a rich intellectual tradition from the Middle East and North Africa. Some important philosophers at the time were Averroes, Ibn Arabi and Maimonides. The Romanised cultures of the Iberian Peninsula interacted with Muslim and Jewish cultures in complex ways, giving the region a distinctive culture. Outside the cities, where the vast majority lived, the land ownership system from Roman times remained largely intact as Muslim leaders rarely dispossessed landowners and the introduction of new crops and techniques led to an expansion of agriculture introducing new produces which originally came from Asia or the former territories of the Roman Empire.

In the 11th century, the Caliphate of Córdoba collapsed, fracturing into a series of petty kingdoms (Taifas), often subject to the payment of a form of protection money (Parias) to the Northern Christian kingdoms, which otherwise undertook a southward territorial expansion. The capture of the strategic city of Toledo in 1085 marked a significant shift in the balance of power in favour of the Christian kingdoms. The arrival from North Africa of the Islamic ruling sects of the Almoravids and the Almohads achieved temporary unity upon the Muslim-ruled territory, with a stricter, less tolerant application of Islam, and partially reversed some Christian territorial gains.

The Kingdom of León was the strongest Christian kingdom for centuries. In 1188 the first modern parliamentary session in Europe was held in León (Cortes of León). The Kingdom of Castile, formed from Leonese territory, was its successor as strongest kingdom. The kings and the nobility fought for power and influence in this period. The example of the Roman emperors influenced the political objective of the Crown, while the nobles benefited from feudalism.

Muslim strongholds in the Guadalquivir Valley such as Córdoba (1236) and Seville (1248) fell to Castile in the 13th century. The County of Barcelona and the Kingdom of Aragon entered in a dynastic union and gained territory and power in the Mediterranean. In 1229 Majorca was conquered, so was Valencia in 1238. In the 13th and 14th centuries, the North-African Marinids established some enclaves around the Strait of Gibraltar.

From the mid 13th century, literature and philosophy started to flourish again in the Christian peninsular kingdoms, based on Roman and Gothic traditions. An important philosopher from this time is Ramon Llull. Abraham Cresques was a prominent Jewish cartographer. Roman law and its institutions were the model for the legislators. The king Alfonso X of Castile focused on strengthening this Roman and Gothic past, and also on linking the Iberian Christian kingdoms with the rest of medieval European Christendom. Alfonso worked for being elected emperor of the Holy Roman Empire and published the Siete Partidas code. The Toledo School of Translators is the name that commonly describes the group of scholars who worked together in the city of Toledo during the 12th and 13th centuries, to translate many of the philosophical and scientific works from Classical Arabic, Ancient Greek, and Ancient Hebrew.

The 13th century also witnessed the Crown of Aragon, centred in Spain's north east, expand its reach across islands in the Mediterranean, to Sicily and Naples. Around this time the universities of Palencia (1212/1263) and Salamanca (1218/1254) were established. The Black Death of 1348 and 1349 devastated Spain.

In 1311, Catalan mercenaries won a victory at the Battle of Halmyros, seizing the Frankish Duchy of Athens.

The royal line of Aragon became extinct with Martin the Humane, and the Compromise of Caspe gave the Crown to the House of Trastámara, already reigning in Castile.

As in the rest of Europe during the Late Middle Ages, antisemitism greatly increased during the 14th century in the Christian kingdoms. (A key event in that regard was the Black Death, as Jews were accused of poisoning the waters.) There were mass killings in Aragon in the mid-14th century, and 12,000 Jews were killed in Toledo. In 1391, Christian mobs went from town to town throughout Castile and Aragon, killing an estimated 50,000 Jews. Women and children were sold as slaves to Muslims, and many synagogues were converted into churches. According to Hasdai Crescas, about 70 Jewish communities were destroyed.

This period saw a contrast in landowning characteristics between the western and north-western territories in Andalusia, where the nobility and the religious orders succeeded into the creation of large latifundia entitled to them, whereas in the Kingdom of Granada (eastern Andalusia), a Crown-auspiciated distribution of the land to medium and small farmers took place.

Upon the conclusion of the Granada War, the Nasrid Sultanate of Granada (the remaining Muslim-ruled polity in the Iberian Peninsula after 1246) capitulated in 1492 to the military strength of the Catholic Monarchs, and it was integrated from then on in the Crown of Castile.

Spanish Empire 

In 1469, the crowns of the Christian kingdoms of Castile and Aragon were united by the marriage of their monarchs, Isabella I and Ferdinand II, respectively. 1478 commenced the completion of the conquest of the Canary Islands.
In 1492, Jews were forced to choose between conversion to Catholicism or facing expulsion. As a result, as many as 200,000 Jews were expelled from Castile and Aragon. This was followed by expulsions in 1493 in Aragonese Sicily and Portugal in 1497. The Treaty of Granada guaranteed religious tolerance towards Muslims, for a few years before Islam was outlawed in 1502 in Castile and 1527 in Aragon, leading the remaining Muslim population to become nominally Christian Moriscos. About four decades after the War of the Alpujarras (1568–1571), a significant proportion of the moriscos were expelled, settling primarily in North Africa. From 1609 to 1614, over 300,000 Moriscos were sent on ships to North Africa and other locations, and, of this figure, around 50,000 died resisting the expulsion, and 60,000 died on the journey.

The year 1492 also marked the arrival of Christopher Columbus in the New World, during a voyage funded by Isabella. Columbus's first voyage crossed the Atlantic and reached the Caribbean Islands, beginning the European exploration and conquest of the Americas, although Columbus remained convinced that he had reached the Orient. Large numbers of indigenous Americans died in battle against the Spaniards during the conquest, while more died from various new Eurasian diseases that travelled more quickly than the Spanish conquerors. The death toll during the initial period of Spanish conquest, from Columbus's initial landing until the mid 16th century, is estimated as high as 70 million indigenous people out of a population of 80 million, as imported diseases such as smallpox, measles, influenza, and typhus decimated the pre-Columbian population. Disease killed between 50% and 95% of the indigenous population.

The Spanish colonisation of the Americas started with the colonisation of the Caribbean. It was followed by the conquest of powerful pre-Columbian polities in Central Mexico and the Pacific Coast of South America. Miscegenation was the rule between the native and the Spanish cultures and people. An expedition sponsored by the Spanish crown completed the first voyage around the world in human history, the Magellan-Elcano circumnavigation. The tornaviaje or return route from the Philippines to Mexico made possible the Manila galleon trading route. The Spanish encountered Islam in Southeast Asia and in order to incorporate the Philippines, Spanish expeditions organised from newly Christianised Mexico had invaded the Philippine territories of the Sultanate of Brunei. The Spanish considered the war with the Muslims of Brunei and the Philippines, a repeat of the Reconquista.

A centralisation of royal power ensued in the Early Modern Period at the expense of local nobility, and the word España, whose root is the ancient name Hispania, began to be commonly used to designate the whole of the two kingdoms.
With their wide-ranging political, legal, religious and military reforms, the Hispanic Monarchy emerged as a world power.

The unification of the crowns of Aragon and Castile by the marriage of their sovereigns laid the basis for modern Spain and the Spanish Empire, although each kingdom of Spain remained a separate country socially, politically, legally, and in currency and language.

Two big revolts broke out during the early reign of the Habsburg emperor, Charles V: the Revolt of the Comuneros in the Crown of Castile and Revolt of the Brotherhoods in the Crown of Aragon.

Habsburg Spain was one of the leading world powers throughout the 16th century and most of the 17th century, a position reinforced by trade and wealth from colonial possessions and became the world's leading maritime power. It reached its apogee during the reigns of the first two Spanish Habsburgs—Charles V/I (1516–1556) and Philip II (1556–1598). This period saw the Italian Wars, the Schmalkaldic War, the Dutch Revolt, the War of the Portuguese Succession, clashes with the Ottomans, intervention in the French Wars of Religion and the Anglo-Spanish War.

Through exploration and conquest or royal marriage alliances and inheritance, the Spanish Empire expanded across vast areas in the Americas, the Indo-Pacific, Africa as well as the European continent (including holdings in the Italian Peninsula, the Low Countries and the Franche-Comté). The first circumnavigation of the world was carried out in 1519–1521. The so-called Age of Discovery featured explorations by sea and by land, the opening-up of new trade routes across oceans, conquests and the beginnings of European colonialism. Precious metals, spices, luxuries, and previously unknown plants brought to the metropole played a leading part in transforming the European understanding of the globe. The cultural efflorescence witnessed during this period is now referred to as the Spanish Golden Age. The expansion of the empire caused immense upheaval in the Americas as the collapse of societies and empires and new diseases from Europe devastated American indigenous populations. The rise of humanism, the Counter-Reformation and new geographical discoveries and conquests raised issues that were addressed by the intellectual movement now known as the School of Salamanca, which developed the first modern theories of what are now known as international law and human rights. Juan Luis Vives was another prominent humanist during this period.

Spain's 16th-century maritime supremacy was demonstrated by the victory over the Ottoman Empire at the Battle of Lepanto in 1571 and over Portugal at the Battle of Ponta Delgada in 1582, and then after the setback of the Spanish Armada in 1588, in a series of victories against England in the Anglo-Spanish War of 1585–1604. However, during the middle decades of the 17th century Spain's maritime power went into a long decline with mounting defeats against the Dutch Republic (Battle of the Downs) and then England in the Anglo-Spanish War of 1654–1660; that by the 1660s it was struggling grimly to defend its overseas possessions from pirates and privateers.

17th century
The 17th century in Spain was a period of major political, economic, and cultural upheaval and decline, despite a flourishing cultural Golden Age. Decline began with the death of King Philip III in 1621. This period of decline was marked by increased taxation, a weakened economy, and the loss of its status as a major European power. The 17th century also saw empire embroiled in a series of exhausting wars, including the Thirty Years War and the War of the Spanish Succession. These wars left Spain depleted and impoverished. The overseas colonies began to rebel against Spanish rule. At the same time, Spain experienced a period of cultural and intellectual flourishing, as the Spanish Golden Age produced some of the most renowned works of literature and art in history. The 17th century also saw the rise of the Inquisition, which sought to enforce religious conformity in the Spanish Empire. By 1700, Spain had lost much of its territory and influence.

The Protestant Reformation dragged the kingdom ever more deeply into the mire of religiously charged wars. The result was a country forced into ever-expanding military efforts across Europe and in the Mediterranean. By the middle decades of a war- and plague-ridden 17th-century Europe, the Spanish Habsburgs had enmeshed the country in continent-wide religious-political conflicts. These conflicts drained it of resources and undermined the economy generally. Spain managed to hold on to most of the scattered Habsburg empire, and help the imperial forces of the Holy Roman Empire reverse a large part of the advances made by Protestant forces, but it was finally forced to recognise the separation of Portugal and the United Provinces (Dutch Republic), and eventually suffered some serious military reverses to France in the latter stages of the immensely destructive, Europe-wide Thirty Years' War. In the latter half of the 17th century, Spain went into a gradual decline, during which it surrendered several small territories to France and England; however, it maintained and enlarged its vast overseas empire, which remained intact until the beginning of the 19th century.

18th century

The decline culminated in a controversy over succession to the throne which consumed the first years of the 18th century. The War of the Spanish Succession was a wide-ranging international conflict combined with a civil war, and was to cost the kingdom its European possessions and its position as one of the leading powers on the Continent.

During this war, a new dynasty originating in France, the Bourbons, was installed. The Crowns of Castile and Aragon had been long united only by the Monarchy and the common institution of the Inquisition's Holy Office. A number of reform policies (the so-called Bourbon Reforms) were pursued by the Monarchy with the overarching goal of centralized authority and administrative uniformity. They included the abolishment of many of the old regional privileges and laws, as well as the customs barrier between the Crowns of Aragon and Castile in 1717, followed by the introduction of new property taxes in the Aragonese kingdoms.

The 18th century saw a gradual recovery and an increase in prosperity through much of the empire. The predominant economic policy was an interventionist one, and the State also pursued policies aiming towards infrastructure development as well as the abolition of internal customs and the reduction of export tariffs. Projects of agricultural colonisation with new settlements took place in the south of Mainland Spain. Enlightenment ideas began to gain ground among some of the kingdom's elite and monarchy.

Liberalism and nation state 

In 1793, Spain went to war against the revolutionary new French Republic as a member of the first Coalition. The subsequent War of the Pyrenees polarised the country in a reaction against the gallicised elites and following defeat in the field, peace was made with France in 1795 at the Peace of Basel in which Spain lost control over two-thirds of the island of Hispaniola. In 1807, a secret treaty between Napoleon and the unpopular prime minister led to a new declaration of war against Britain and Portugal. French troops entered the country to invade Portugal but instead occupied Spain's major fortresses. The Spanish king abdicated and a puppet kingdom satellite to the French Empire was installed with Napoleon's brother Joseph Bonaparte as king.

The 2 May 1808 revolt was one of many uprisings across the country against the French occupation. These revolts marked the beginning of a devastating war of independence against the Napoleonic regime.

Further military action by Spanish armies, guerrilla warfare and an Anglo-Portuguese allied army, combined with Napoleon's failure on the Russian front, led to the retreat of French imperial armies from the Iberian Peninsula in 1814, and the return of King Ferdinand VII.

During the war, in 1810, a revolutionary body, the Cortes of Cádiz, was assembled to co-ordinate the effort against the Bonapartist regime and to prepare a constitution. It met as one body, and its members represented the entire Spanish empire. In 1812, a constitution for universal representation under a constitutional monarchy was declared, but after the fall of the Bonapartist regime, the Spanish king dismissed the Cortes Generales, set on ruling as an absolute monarch.

The French occupation of Mainland Spain created an opportunity for overseas criollo elites who resented the privilege towards Peninsular elites and demanded retroversion of the sovereignty to the people. Starting in 1809 the American colonies began a series of revolutions and declared independence, leading to the Spanish American wars of independence that put an end to the metropole's grip over the Spanish Main. Attempts to re-assert control proved futile with opposition not only in the colonies but also in the Iberian peninsula and army revolts followed, led by liberal officers. By the end of 1826, the only American colonies Spain held were Cuba and Puerto Rico.

The Napoleonic War left Spain economically ruined, deeply divided and politically unstable. In the 1830s and 1840s, Carlism (a reactionary legitimist movement supportive of an alternative Bourbon branch), fought against the government forces supportive of Queen Isabella II's dynastic rights in the Carlist Wars. Government forces prevailed, but the conflict between progressives and moderates ended in a weak early constitutional period.

In the late 19th century nationalist movements arose in the Philippines and Cuba. In 1895 and 1896 the Cuban War of Independence and the Philippine Revolution broke out and eventually the United States became involved. The Spanish–American War was fought in the spring of 1898 and resulted in Spain losing the last of its once vast colonial empire outside of North Africa. El Desastre (the Disaster), as the war became known in Spain, gave added impetus to the Generation of '98 who were analyzing the country.

Although the period around the turn of the century was one of increasing prosperity, the 20th century brought little social peace; Spain played a minor part in the scramble for Africa, with the colonisation of Western Sahara, Spanish Morocco and Spanish Guinea. It remained neutral during World War I. The heavy losses suffered by the colonial troops in conflicts in northern Morocco against Riffians forces brought discredit to the government and undermined the monarchy.

Industrialisation, the development of railways and incipient capitalism developed in several areas of the country, particularly in Barcelona, as well as Labour movement and socialist and anarchist ideas. The 1888 Barcelona Universal Exposition and the 1870 Barcelona Labour Congress are good examples of this. In 1879, the Spanish Socialist Workers' Party was founded. A trade union linked to this party, Unión General de Trabajadores, was founded in 1888. In the anarcho-sindicalist trend of the labour movement in Spain, Confederación Nacional del Trabajo was founded in 1910 and Federación Anarquista Ibérica in 1927.

Catalanism and Vasquism, alongside other nationalisms and regionalisms in Spain, arose in that period, being the Basque Nationalist Party formed in 1895 and Regionalist League of Catalonia in 1901.

Political corruption and repression weakened the democratic system of the constitutional monarchy of a two-parties system. The July 1909 Tragic Week events and repression exemplified the social instability of the time.

The La Canadiense strike in 1919 led to the first law limiting the working day to eight hours.

After a period of Crown-supported dictatorship from 1923 to 1931, the first elections since 1923, largely understood as a plebiscite on Monarchy, took place: the 12 April 1931 municipal elections. These gave a resounding victory to the Republican-Socialist candidacies in large cities and provincial capitals, with a majority of monarchist councilors in rural areas. The king left the country and the proclamation of the Republic on 14 April ensued, with the formation of a provisional government.

A constitution for the country was passed in October 1931 following the June 1931 Constituent general election, and a series of cabinets presided by Manuel Azaña supported by republican parties and the PSOE followed. In the election held in 1933 the right triumphed and in 1936, the left. During the Second Republic there was a great political and social upheaval, marked by a sharp radicalization of the left and the right. Instances of political violence during this period included the burning of churches, the 1932 failed coup d'état led by José Sanjurjo, the Revolution of 1934 and numerous attacks against rival political leaders. On the other hand, it is also during the Second Republic when important reforms to modernize the country were initiated: a democratic constitution, agrarian reform, restructuring of the army, political decentralization and women's right to vote.

Civil War and Francoist dictatorship 

The Spanish Civil War broke out in 1936: on 17 and 18 July, part of the military carried out a coup d'état that triumphed in only part of the country. The situation led to a civil war, in which the territory was divided into two zones: one under the authority of the Republican government, that counted on outside support from the Soviet Union and Mexico (and from International Brigades), and the other controlled by the putschists (the Nationalist or rebel faction), most critically supported by Nazi Germany and Fascist Italy. The Republic was not supported by the Western powers due to the British-led policy of non-intervention. General Francisco Franco was sworn in as the supreme leader of the rebels on 1 October 1936. An uneasy relationship between the Republican government and the grassroots anarchists who had initiated a partial Social revolution also ensued.

The civil war was viciously fought and there were many atrocities committed by all sides. The war claimed the lives of over 500,000 people and caused the flight of up to a half-million citizens from the country. On 1 April 1939, five months before the beginning of World War II, the rebel side led by Franco emerged victorious, imposing a dictatorship over the whole country. Thousands of men and women were imprisoned after the civil war in Francoist concentration camps, with approximately 367,000 to 500,000 prisoners being held in 50 camps or prisons.

The regime remained chiefly "neutral" from a nominal standpoint in the Second World War (it briefly switched its position to "non-belligerent"), although it was sympathetic to the Axis and provided the Nazi Wehrmacht with Spanish volunteers in the Eastern Front. The only legal party under Franco's dictatorship was the Falange Española Tradicionalista y de las JONS (FET y de las JONS), formed in 1937 upon the merging of the Fascist Falange Española de las JONS and the Carlist traditionalists and to which the rest of right-wing groups supporting the rebels also added. The name of "Movimiento Nacional", sometimes understood as a wider structure than the FET y de las JONS proper, largely imposed over the later's name in official documents along the 1950s.

After World War II Spain was politically and economically isolated, and was kept out of the United Nations. This changed in 1955, during the Cold War period, when it became strategically important for the US to establish a military presence on the Iberian Peninsula as a counter to any possible move by the Soviet Union into the Mediterranean basin. In the 1960s, Spain registered an unprecedented rate of economic growth which was propelled by industrialisation, a mass internal migration from rural areas to Madrid, Barcelona and the Basque Country and the creation of a mass tourism industry. Franco's rule was also characterised by authoritarianism, promotion of a unitary national identity, National Catholicism, and discriminatory language policies.

Restoration of democracy 

In 1962, a group of politicians involved in the opposition to Franco's regime inside the country and in exile met in the congress of the European Movement in Munich, where they made a resolution in favour of democracy.

With Franco's death in November 1975, Juan Carlos succeeded to the position of King of Spain and head of state in accordance with the Francoist law. With the approval of the new Spanish Constitution of 1978 and the restoration of democracy, the State devolved much authority to the regions and created an internal organisation based on autonomous communities. The Spanish 1977 Amnesty Law let people of Franco's regime continue inside institutions without consequences, even perpetrators of some crimes during transition to democracy like the Massacre of 3 March 1976 in Vitoria or 1977 Massacre of Atocha.

In the Basque Country, moderate Basque nationalism coexisted with a radical nationalist movement led by the armed organisation ETA until the latter's dissolution in May 2018. The group was formed in 1959 during Franco's rule but had continued to wage its violent campaign even after the restoration of democracy and the return of a large measure of regional autonomy.

On 23 February 1981, rebel elements among the security forces seized the Cortes in an attempt to impose a military-backed government. King Juan Carlos took personal command of the military and successfully ordered the coup plotters, via national television, to surrender.

During the 1980s the democratic restoration made possible a growing open society. New cultural movements based on freedom appeared, like La Movida Madrileña. In May 1982 Spain joined NATO, followed by a referendum after a strong social opposition. That year the Spanish Socialist Workers Party (PSOE) came to power, the first left-wing government in 43 years. In 1986 Spain joined the European Economic Community, which later became the European Union. The PSOE was replaced in government by the Partido Popular (PP) in 1996 after scandals around participation of the government of Felipe González in the Dirty war against ETA; at that point the PSOE had served almost 14 consecutive years in office.

On 1 January 2002, Spain fully adopted the euro, and Spain experienced strong economic growth, well above the EU average during the early 2000s. However, well-publicised concerns issued by many economic commentators at the height of the boom warned that extraordinary property prices and a high foreign trade deficit were likely to lead to a painful economic collapse.

In 2002, the Prestige oil spill occurred with big ecological consequences along Spain's Atlantic coastline. In 2003 José María Aznar supported US president George W. Bush in the Iraq War, and a strong movement against war rose in Spanish society. In March 2004 a local Islamist terrorist group inspired by Al-Qaeda carried out the largest terrorist attack in Western European history when they killed 191 people and wounded more than 1,800 others by bombing commuter trains in Madrid. Though initial suspicions focused on the Basque terrorist group ETA, evidence of Islamist involvement soon emerged. Because of the proximity of the 2004 Spanish general election, the issue of responsibility quickly became a political controversy, with the main competing parties PP and PSOE exchanging accusations over the handling of the incident. The PSOE won the election, led by José Luis Rodríguez Zapatero.

In the early 2000s, the proportion of Spain's foreign born population increased rapidly during its economic boom but then declined due to the financial crisis. In 2005, the Spanish government legalised same sex marriage, becoming the third country worldwide to do so. Decentralisation was supported with much resistance of Constitutional Court and conservative opposition, so did gender politics like quotas or the law against gender violence. Government talks with ETA happened, and the group announced its permanent cease of violence in 2010.

The bursting of the Spanish property bubble in 2008 led to the 2008–16 Spanish financial crisis. High levels of unemployment, cuts in government spending and corruption in Royal family and People's Party served as a backdrop to the 2011–12 Spanish protests. Catalan independentism also rose. In 2011, Mariano Rajoy's conservative People's Party won the election with 44.6% of votes. As prime minister, he implemented austerity measures for EU bailout, the EU Stability and Growth Pact. On 19 June 2014, the monarch, Juan Carlos, abdicated in favour of his son, who became Felipe VI.

In October 2017 a Catalan independence referendum was held and the Catalan parliament voted to unilaterally declare independence from Spain to form a Catalan Republic on the day the Spanish Senate was discussing approving direct rule over Catalonia as called for by the Spanish Prime Minister. On the same day the Senate granted the power to impose direct rule and Rajoy dissolved the Catalan parliament and called a new election. No country recognised Catalonia as a separate state.

In June 2018, the Congress of Deputies passed a motion of no-confidence against Rajoy and replaced him with the PSOE leader Pedro Sánchez.

In January 2020, the COVID-19 virus was confirmed to have spread to Spain, where it had caused as of June 2021 more than 80,000 deaths, causing life expectancy to drop by more than 1 year.

In March 2021, Spain became the sixth nation in the world to make active euthanasia legal.

Geography 

At , Spain is the world's fifty-second largest country and Europe's fourth largest country. It is some  smaller than France. Mount Teide (Tenerife) is the highest mountain peak in Spain and is the third largest volcano in the world from its base. Spain is a transcontinental country, having territory in both Europe and Africa.

Spain lies between latitudes 27° and 44° N, and longitudes 19° W and 5° E.

On the west, Spain is bordered by Portugal; on the south, it is bordered by Gibraltar (a British overseas territory) and Morocco, through its exclaves in North Africa (Ceuta and Melilla, and the peninsula of de Vélez de la Gomera). On the northeast, along the Pyrenees mountain range, it is bordered by France and Andorra. Along the Pyrenees in Girona, a small exclave town called Llívia is surrounded by France.

Islands 

The peninsula of de Vélez de la Gomera is also regarded as a plaza de soberanía. The isle of Alborán, located in the Mediterranean between Spain and North Africa, is also administered by Spain, specifically by the municipality of Almería, Andalusia. The little Pheasant Island in the River Bidasoa is a Spanish-French condominium.

There are 11 major islands in Spain, all of them having their own governing bodies (Cabildos insulares in the Canaries, Consells insulars in Baleares). These islands are specifically mentioned by the Spanish Constitution, when fixing its Senatorial representation (Ibiza and Formentera are grouped, as they together form the Pityusic islands, part of the Balearic archipelago). These islands include Tenerife, Gran Canaria, Lanzarote, Fuerteventura, La Palma, La Gomera and El Hierro in the Canarian archipelago and Mallorca, Ibiza, Menorca and Formentera in the Balearic archipelago.

Mountains and rivers 

Mainland Spain is a rather mountainous landmass, dominated by high plateaus and mountain chains. After the Pyrenees, the main mountain ranges are the Cordillera Cantábrica (Cantabrian Range), Sistema Ibérico (Iberian System), Sistema Central (Central System), Montes de Toledo, Sierra Morena and the Sistema Bético (Baetic System) whose highest peak, the  Mulhacén, located in Sierra Nevada, is the highest elevation in the Iberian Peninsula. The highest point in Spain is the Teide, a  active volcano in the Canary Islands. The Meseta Central (often translated as 'Inner Plateau') is a vast plateau in the heart of peninsular Spain split in two by the Sistema Central.

There are several major rivers in Spain such as the Tagus (Tajo), Ebro, Guadiana, Douro (Duero), Guadalquivir, Júcar, Segura, Turia and Minho (Miño). Alluvial plains are found along the coast, the largest of which is that of the Guadalquivir in Andalusia.

Climate 

Three main climatic zones can be separated, according to geographical situation and orographic conditions:
 The Mediterranean climate, characterised by warm/hot and dry summers, is dominant in the peninsula. It has two varieties: Csa and Csb according to the Köppen climate classification.
 The Csa zone is associated to areas with hot summers. It is predominant in the Mediterranean and Southern Atlantic coast and inland throughout Andalusia, Extremadura and much, if not most, of the centre of the country. The Csa zone covers climatic zones with both warm and cool winters which are considered extremely different from each other at a local level, reason for which Köppen classification is often eschewed within Spain. Local climatic maps generally divide the Mediterranean zone (which covers most of the country) between warm-winter and cool-winter zones, rather than according to summer temperatures.
 The Csb zone has warm rather than hot summers, and extends to additional cool-winter areas not typically associated with a Mediterranean climate, such as much of central and northern-central of Spain (e.g. western Castile–León, northeastern Castilla-La Mancha and northern Madrid) and into much rainier areas (notably Galicia). Note areas with substantial summer rainfall such as Galicia are classed as oceanic.
 The semi-arid climate (BSk, BSh), is predominant in the southeastern quarter of the country, but is also widespread in other areas of Spain. It covers most of the Region of Murcia, southern Valencia and eastern Andalusia. Further to the north, it is predominant in the upper and mid reaches of the Ebro valley, which crosses southern Navarre, central Aragon and western Catalonia. It also is found in Madrid, Extremadura, Castilla-La Mancha, and some locations of western Andalusia. The dry season extends beyond the summer and average temperature depends on altitude and latitude.
 The oceanic climate (Cfb), located in the northern quarter of the country, especially in the Atlantic region (Basque Country, Cantabria, Asturias, and partly Galicia and Castile–León). Additionally it is also found in northern Navarre, in most highlands areas along the Iberian System and in the Pyrenean valleys, where a humid subtropical variant (Cfa) also occurs. Winter and summer temperatures are influenced by the ocean, and have no seasonal drought.

Apart from these main types, other sub-types can be found, like the alpine climate in areas with very high altitude, the humid subtropical climate in areas of northeastern Spain and the continental climates (Dfc, Dfb / Dsc, Dsb) in the Pyrenees as well as parts of the Cantabrian Range, the Central System, Sierra Nevada and the Iberian System, and a typical desert climate (BWk, BWh) in the zone of Almería, Murcia and eastern Canary Islands. Low-lying areas of the Canary Islands average above  during their coolest month, thus having a tropical climate.

Fauna and flora 

The fauna presents a wide diversity that is due in large part to the geographical position of the Iberian peninsula between the Atlantic and the Mediterranean and between Africa and Eurasia, and the great diversity of habitats and biotopes, the result of a considerable variety of climates and well differentiated regions.

The vegetation of Spain is varied due to several factors including the diversity of the terrain, the climate and latitude. Spain includes different phytogeographic regions, each with its own floral characteristics resulting largely from the interaction of climate, topography, soil type and fire, and biotic factors. The country had a 2019 Forest Landscape Integrity Index mean score of 4.23/10, ranking it 130th globally out of 172 countries.

Within the European territory, Spain has the largest number of plant species (7,600 vascular plants) of all European countries.

In Spain there are 17.804 billion trees and an average of 284 million more grow each year.

Politics 

The constitutional history of Spain dates back to the constitution of 1812. In June 1976, Spain's new King Juan Carlos dismissed Carlos Arias Navarro and appointed the reformer Adolfo Suárez as Prime Minister. The resulting general election in 1977 convened the Constituent Cortes (the Spanish Parliament, in its capacity as a constitutional assembly) for the purpose of drafting and approving the constitution of 1978. After a national referendum on 6 December 1978, 88% of voters approved of the new constitution – a culmination of the Spanish transition to democracy.

As a result, Spain is now composed of 17 autonomous communities and two autonomous cities with varying degrees of autonomy thanks to its Constitution, which nevertheless explicitly states the indivisible unity of the Spanish nation. The constitution also specifies that Spain has no state religion and that all are free to practice and believe as they wish.

The Spanish administration approved the Gender Equality Act in 2007 aimed at furthering equality between genders in Spanish political and economic life. According to Inter-Parliamentary Union data as of 1 September 2018, 137 of the 350 members of the Congress were women (39.1%), while in the Senate, there were 101 women out of 266 (39.9%), placing Spain 16th on their list of countries ranked by proportion of women in the lower (or single) House. The Gender Empowerment Measure of Spain in the United Nations Human Development Report is 0.794, 12th in the world.

Government 

Spain is a constitutional monarchy, with a hereditary monarch and a bicameral parliament, the Cortes Generales.

The legislative branch is made up of the Congress of Deputies (Congreso de los Diputados), a lower house with 350 members, elected by popular vote on block lists by proportional representation to serve four-year terms, and the Senate (Senado), an upper house with 259 seats of which 208 are directly elected by popular vote, using a limited voting method, and the other 51 appointed by the regional legislatures to also serve four-year terms.

The executive branch consists of a Council of Ministers presided over by the Prime Minister, who is nominated as candidate by the monarch after holding consultations with representatives from the different parliamentary groups, voted in by the members of the lower house during an investiture session and then formally appointed by the monarch.

 Head of State (King)
 Felipe VI, since 19 June 2014
 Government

 Prime Minister (head of government) or "President of the Government" (Presidente del Gobierno): Pedro Sánchez Pérez-Castejón, elected 1 June 2018.
 Deputy prime ministers (designated by the Prime Minister): Currently Nadia Calviño Santamaría (1st), Yolanda Díaz Pérez (2nd), Teresa Ribera Rodríguez (3rd).
 Ministers (designated by the Prime Minister): Second government of Pedro Sánchez.
The Prime Minister, deputy prime ministers and the rest of ministers convene at the Council of Ministers.

Spain is organisationally structured as a so-called Estado de las Autonomías ("State of Autonomies"); it is one of the most decentralised countries in Europe, along with Switzerland, Germany and Belgium; for example, all autonomous communities have their own elected parliaments, governments, public administrations, budgets, and resources. Health and education systems among others are managed by the Spanish communities, and in addition, the Basque Country and Navarre also manage their own public finances based on foral provisions. In Catalonia, the Basque Country, Navarre and the Canary Islands, a full-fledged autonomous police corps replaces some of the State police functions (see Mossos d'Esquadra, Ertzaintza, Policía Foral/Foruzaingoa and Policía Canaria).

Foreign relations 

After the return of democracy following the death of Franco in 1975, Spain's foreign policy priorities were to break out of the diplomatic isolation of the Franco years and expand diplomatic relations, enter the European Community, and define security relations with the West.

As a member of NATO since 1982, Spain has established itself as a participant in multilateral international security activities. Spain's EU membership represents an important part of its foreign policy. Even on many international issues beyond western Europe, Spain prefers to coordinate its efforts with its EU partners through the European political co-operation mechanisms.

Spain has maintained its special relations with Hispanic America and the Philippines. Its policy emphasises the concept of an Ibero-American community, essentially the renewal of the concept of "Hispanidad" or "Hispanismo", as it is often referred to in English, which has sought to link the Iberian Peninsula with Hispanic America through language, commerce, history and culture. It is fundamentally "based on shared values and the recovery of democracy."

Territorial disputes
Spain claims Gibraltar, a  Overseas Territory of the United Kingdom in the southernmost part of the Iberian Peninsula. Then a Spanish town, it was conquered by an Anglo-Dutch force in 1704 during the War of the Spanish Succession on behalf of Archduke Charles, pretender to the Spanish throne.

The legal situation concerning Gibraltar was settled in 1713 by the Treaty of Utrecht, in which Spain ceded the territory in perpetuity to the British Crown stating that, should the British abandon this post, it would be offered to Spain first. Since the 1940s Spain has called for the return of Gibraltar. The overwhelming majority of Gibraltarians strongly oppose this, along with any proposal of shared sovereignty. UN resolutions call on the United Kingdom and Spain to reach an agreement over the status of Gibraltar.

The Spanish claim makes a distinction between the isthmus that connects the Rock to the Spanish mainland on the one hand, and the Rock and city of Gibraltar on the other. While the Rock and city were ceded by the Treaty of Utrecht, Spain asserts that the "occupation of the isthmus is illegal and against the principles of International Law". The United Kingdom relies on de facto arguments of possession by prescription in relation to the isthmus, as there has been "continuous possession [of the isthmus] over a long period".

Another dispute surrounds the Savage Islands, which Spain acknowledges to be part of Portugal. However, Spain claims that they are rocks rather than islands, and therefore Spain does not accept the Portuguese Exclusive Economic Zone (200 nautical miles) generated by the islands, while acknowledging the Selvagens as possessing territorial waters (12 nautical miles). On 5 July 2013, Spain sent a letter to the UN expressing these views.

Spain claims sovereignty over the Perejil Island, a small, uninhabited rocky islet located in the South shore of the Strait of Gibraltar. Its sovereignty is disputed between Spain and Morocco. It was the subject of an armed incident between the two countries in 2002. The incident ended when both countries agreed to return to the status quo ante which existed prior to the Moroccan occupation of the island. The islet is now deserted and without any sign of sovereignty.

Besides the Perejil Island, the Spanish-held territories claimed by other countries are two: Morocco claims the Spanish cities of Ceuta and Melilla and the plazas de soberanía islets off the northern coast of Africa. Portugal does not recognise Spain's sovereignty over the territory of Olivenza which was annexed by Spain in 1801 after the War of the Oranges. The Portuguese stance is that the territory is de iure Portuguese territory and de facto Spanish.

Military 

The armed forces of Spain are known as the Spanish Armed Forces (Fuerzas Armadas Españolas). Their commander-in-chief is the King of Spain, Felipe VI.

The next military authorities in line are the Prime Minister and the Minister of Defence. The fourth military authority of the State is the Chief of the Defence Staff (JEMAD). The Defence Staff (Estado Mayor de la Defensa) assists the JEMAD as auxiliary body.

The Spanish Armed Forces are divided into three branches:
 Army (Ejército de Tierra)
 Navy (Armada)
 Air and Space Force (Ejército del Aire y del Espacio)

Military conscription was suppressed in 2001.

Human rights 

The Spanish Constitution of 1978 "protect all Spaniards and all the peoples of Spain in the exercise of human rights, their cultures and traditions, languages and institutions".

According to Amnesty International (AI), government investigations of alleged police abuses are often lengthy and punishments were light. Violence against women was a problem, which the Government took steps to address.

Spain provides one of the highest degrees of liberty in the world for its LGBT community. Among the countries studied by Pew Research Center in 2013, Spain is rated first in acceptance of homosexuality, with 88% of those surveyed saying that homosexuality should be accepted.

Administrative divisions 

The Spanish State is divided into 17 autonomous communities and 2 autonomous cities, both groups being the highest or first-order administrative division in the country. Autonomous communities are divided into provinces, of which there are 50 in total, and in turn, provinces are divided into municipalities. In Catalonia, two additional divisions exist, the comarques (sing. comarca) and the vegueries (sing. vegueria) both of which have administrative powers; comarques being aggregations of municipalities, and the vegueries being aggregations of comarques. The concept of a comarca exists in all autonomous communities, however, unlike Catalonia, these are merely historical or geographical subdivisions.

Autonomous communities 

Spain's autonomous communities are the first level administrative divisions of the country. They were created after the current constitution came into effect (in 1978) in recognition of the right to self-government of the "nationalities and regions of Spain". The autonomous communities were to comprise adjacent provinces with common historical, cultural, and economic traits. This territorial organisation, based on devolution, is known in Spain as the "State of Autonomies".

The basic institutional law of each autonomous community is the Statute of Autonomy. The Statutes of Autonomy establish the name of the community according to its historical and contemporary identity, the limits of its territories, the name and organisation of the institutions of government and the rights they enjoy according to the constitution.

The governments of all autonomous communities must be based on a division of powers and comprise
 a legislative assembly whose members must be elected by universal suffrage according to the system of proportional representation and in which all areas that integrate the territory are fairly represented;
 a government council, with executive and administrative functions headed by a president, elected by the Legislative Assembly and nominated by the King of Spain;
 a supreme court, under the supreme court of Spain, which heads the judiciary in the autonomous community.

Catalonia, Galicia and the Basque Country, which identified themselves as nationalities, were granted self-government through a rapid process. Andalusia also identified itself as a nationality in its first Statute of Autonomy, even though it followed the longer process stipulated in the constitution for the rest of the country. Progressively, other communities in revisions to their Statutes of Autonomy have also taken that denomination in accordance with their historical and modern identities, such as the Valencian Community, the Canary Islands, the Balearic Islands, and Aragon.

The autonomous communities have wide legislative and executive autonomy, with their own parliaments and  governments. The distribution of powers may be different for every community, as laid out in their Statutes of Autonomy, since devolution was intended to be asymmetrical. Only two communities—the Basque Country and Navarre—have full fiscal autonomy. Beyond fiscal autonomy, the nationalities—Andalusia, the Basque Country, Catalonia, and Galicia—were devolved more powers than the rest of the communities, among them the ability of the regional president to dissolve the parliament and call for elections at any time. In addition, the Basque Country, Catalonia and Navarre have police corps of their own: Ertzaintza, Mossos d'Esquadra and the Policía Foral respectively. Other communities have more limited forces or none at all, like the Policía Autónoma Andaluza in Andalusia or the BESCAM in Madrid.

Nonetheless, recent amendments to existing Statutes of Autonomy or the promulgation of new Statutes altogether, have reduced the asymmetry between the powers originally granted to the nationalities and the rest of the regions.

Finally, along with the 17 autonomous communities, two autonomous cities are also part of the State of Autonomies and are first-order territorial divisions: Ceuta and Melilla. These are two exclaves located in the northern African coast.

Provinces and municipalities 

Autonomous communities are divided into provinces, which served as their territorial building blocks. In turn, provinces are divided into municipalities. The existence of both the provinces and the municipalities is guaranteed and protected by the constitution, not necessarily by the Statutes of Autonomy themselves. Municipalities are granted autonomy to manage their internal affairs, and provinces are the territorial divisions designed to carry out the activities of the State.

The current provincial division structure is based—with minor changes—on the 1833 territorial division by Javier de Burgos, and in all, the Spanish territory is divided into 50 provinces. The communities of Asturias, Cantabria, La Rioja, the Balearic Islands, Madrid, Murcia and Navarre are the only communities that comprise a single province, which is coextensive with the community itself. In these cases, the administrative institutions of the province are replaced by the governmental institutions of the community.

Economy 

Spain's capitalist mixed economy is the 14th largest worldwide and the 4th largest in the European Union, as well as the Eurozone's 4th largest.

The centre-right government of former prime minister José María Aznar worked successfully to gain admission to the group of countries launching the euro in 1999. Unemployment stood at 17.1% in June 2017, below Spain's early 1990s unemployment rate of at over 20%. The youth unemployment rate (35% in March 2018) is extremely high compared to EU standards. Perennial weak points of Spain's economy include a large informal economy, and an education system which OECD reports place among the poorest for developed countries, along with the United States.

By the mid-1990s the economy had commenced the growth that had been disrupted by the global recession of the early 1990s. The strong economic growth helped the government to reduce the government debt as a percentage of GDP and Spain's high unemployment rate began to steadily decline. With the government budget in balance and inflation under control Spain was admitted into the Eurozone in 1999.

Since the 1990s some Spanish companies have gained multinational status, often expanding their activities in culturally close Latin America. Spain is the second biggest foreign investor there, after the United States. Spanish companies have also expanded into Asia, especially China and India. This early global expansion is a competitive advantage over its competitors and European neighbours. The reason for this early expansion is the booming interest towards Spanish language and culture in Asia and Africa and a corporate culture that learned to take risks in unstable markets.

Spanish companies invested in fields like renewable energy commercialisation (Iberdrola was the world's largest renewable energy operator), technology companies like Telefónica, Abengoa, Mondragon Corporation (which is the world's largest worker-owned cooperative), Movistar, Hisdesat, Indra, train manufacturers like CAF, Talgo, global corporations such as the textile company Inditex, petroleum companies like Repsol or Cepsa and infrastructure, with six of the ten biggest international construction firms specialising in transport being Spanish, like Ferrovial, Acciona, ACS, OHL and FCC.

In 2005 the Economist Intelligence Unit's quality of life survey placed Spain among the top 10 in the world. In 2013 the same survey (now called the "Where-to-be-born index"), ranked Spain 28th in the world.

In 2010, the Basque city of Bilbao was awarded with the Lee Kuan Yew World City Prize, and its mayor at the time, Iñaki Azkuna, was awarded the World Mayor Prize in 2012. The Basque capital city of Vitoria-Gasteiz received the European Green Capital Award in 2012.

Automotive industry

The automotive industry is one of the largest employers in the country. In 2015 Spain was the 8th largest automobile producer country in the world and the 2nd largest car manufacturer in Europe after Germany.

By 2016, the automotive industry was generating 8.7 percent of Spain's gross domestic product, employing about nine percent of the manufacturing industry. By 2008 the automobile industry was the 2nd most exported industry while in 2015 about 80% of the total production was for export.

German companies poured €4.8 billion into Spain in 2015, making the country the second-largest destination for German foreign direct investment behind only the U.S. The lion's share of that investment—€4 billion—went to the country's auto industry.

Agriculture 

Crop areas were farmed in two highly diverse manners. Areas relying on non-irrigated cultivation (secano), which made up 85% of the entire crop area, depended solely on rainfall as a source of water. They included the humid regions of the north and the northwest, as well as vast arid zones that had not been irrigated. The much more productive regions devoted to irrigated cultivation (regadío) accounted for 3 million hectares in 1986, and the government hoped that this area would eventually double, as it already had doubled since 1950. Particularly noteworthy was the development in Almería—one of the most arid and desolate provinces of Spain—of winter crops of various fruits and vegetables for export to Europe.

Though only about 17% of Spain's cultivated land was irrigated, it was estimated to be the source of between 40 and 45% of the gross value of crop production and of 50% of the value of agricultural exports. More than half of the irrigated area was planted in corn, fruit trees, and vegetables. Other agricultural products that benefited from irrigation included grapes, cotton, sugar beets, potatoes, legumes, olive trees, mangos, strawberries, tomatoes, and fodder grasses. Depending on the nature of the crop, it was possible to harvest two successive crops in the same year on about 10% of the country's irrigated land.

Citrus fruits, vegetables, cereal grains, olive oil, and wine—Spain's traditional agricultural products—continued to be important in the 1980s. In 1983 they represented 12%, 12%, 8%, 6%, and 4%, respectively, of the country's agricultural production. Because of the changed diet of an increasingly affluent population, there was a notable increase in the consumption of livestock, poultry, and dairy products. Meat production for domestic consumption became the single most important agricultural activity, accounting for 30% of all farm-related production in 1983. Increased attention to livestock was the reason that Spain became a net importer of grains. Ideal growing conditions, combined with proximity to important north European markets, made citrus fruits Spain's leading export. Fresh vegetables and fruits produced through intensive irrigation farming also became important export commodities, as did sunflower seed oil that was produced to compete with the more expensive olive oils in oversupply throughout the Mediterranean countries of the European Community.

Tourism 

In 2017, Spain was the second most visited country in the world, recording 82 million tourists which marked the fifth consecutive year of record-beating numbers. The headquarters of the World Tourism Organization are located in Madrid.

Spain's geographic location, popular coastlines, diverse landscapes, historical legacy, vibrant culture, and excellent infrastructure has made the country's international tourist industry among the largest in the world. In the last five decades, international tourism in Spain has grown to become the second largest in the world in terms of spending, worth approximately 40 billion Euros or about 5% of GDP in 2006.

Castile and Leon is the Spanish leader in rural tourism linked to its environmental and architectural heritage.

Energy 

In 2010 Spain became the solar power world leader when it overtook the United States with a massive power station plant called La Florida, near Alvarado, Badajoz. Spain is also Europe's main producer of wind energy. In 2010 its wind turbines generated 42,976 GWh, which accounted for 16.4% of all electrical energy produced in Spain. On 9 November 2010, wind energy reached an instantaneous historic peak covering 53% of mainland electricity demand and generating an amount of energy that is equivalent to that of 14 nuclear reactors. Other renewable energies used in Spain are hydroelectric, biomass and marine (2 power plants under construction).

Non-renewable energy sources used in Spain are nuclear (8 operative reactors), gas, coal, and oil. Fossil fuels together generated 58% of Spain's electricity in 2009, just below the OECD mean of 61%. Nuclear power generated another 19%, and wind and hydro about 12% each.

Transport 

The Spanish road system is mainly centralised, with six highways connecting Madrid to the Basque Country, Catalonia, Valencia, West Andalusia, Extremadura and Galicia. Additionally, there are highways along the Atlantic (Ferrol to Vigo), Cantabrian (Oviedo to San Sebastián) and Mediterranean (Girona to Cádiz) coasts. Spain aims to put one million electric cars on the road by 2014 as part of the government's plan to save energy and boost energy efficiency. The former Minister of Industry Miguel Sebastián said that "the electric vehicle is the future and the engine of an industrial revolution."

Spain has the most extensive high-speed rail network in Europe, and the second-most extensive in the world after China. On average, the Spanish high-speed train is the fastest one in the world, followed by the Japanese bullet train and the French TGV. Regarding punctuality, it is second in the world (98.5% on-time arrival) after the Japanese Shinkansen (99%). Should the aims of the ambitious AVE programme (Spanish high speed trains) be met, by 2020 Spain will have  of high-speed trains linking almost all provincial cities to Madrid in less than three hours and Barcelona within four hours.

There are 47 public airports in Spain. The busiest one is the airport of Madrid (Barajas), with 50 million passengers in 2011, being the world's 15th busiest airport, as well as the European Union's fourth busiest. The airport of Barcelona (El Prat) is also important, with 35 million passengers in 2011, being the world's 31st-busiest airport. Other main airports are located in Majorca (23 million passengers), Málaga (13 million passengers), Las Palmas (Gran Canaria) (11 million passengers), Alicante (10 million passengers) and smaller, with the number of passengers between 4 and 10 million, for example Tenerife (two airports), Valencia, Seville, Bilbao, Ibiza, Lanzarote, Fuerteventura. Also, more than 30 airports with the number of passengers below 4 million.

Science and technology 

The Consejo Superior de Investigaciones Científicas (CSIC) is the leading public agency dedicated to scientific research in the country. It ranked as the 5th top governmental scientific institution worldwide (and 32nd overall) in the 2018 SCImago Institutions Rankings. Spain was ranked 30th in the Global Innovation Index in 2021, down from 29th in 2019.

Higher education institutions (administered at the regional, NUTS2 level) perform about a 60% of the basic research in the country. Likewise, the contribution of the private sector to R&D expenditures is much lower than in other EU and OECD countries.

Since 2006, the Mobile World Congress has taken place in Barcelona.

Demographics 

In 2019, the population of Spain officially reached 47 million people, as recorded by the Padrón municipal (Spain's Municipal Register). Spain's population density, at 91/km2 (235/sq mi), is lower than that of most Western European countries and its distribution across the country is very unequal. With the exception of the region surrounding the capital, Madrid, the most populated areas lie around the coast. The population of Spain has risen 2 1/2 times since 1900, when it stood at 18.6 million, principally due to the spectacular demographic boom in the 1960s and early 1970s.

In 2017, the average total fertility rate (TFR) across Spain was 1.33 children born per woman, one of the lowest in the world, below the replacement rate of 2.1, it remains considerably below the high of 5.11 children born per woman in 1865. Spain subsequently has one of the oldest populations in the world, with the average age of 43.1 years.

Native Spaniards make up 88% of the total population of Spain. After the birth rate plunged in the 1980s and Spain's population growth rate dropped, the population again trended upward initially upon the return of many Spaniards who had emigrated to other European countries during the 1970s, and more recently, fuelled by large numbers of immigrants who make up 12% of the population. The immigrants originate mainly in Latin America (39%), North Africa (16%), Eastern Europe (15%), and Sub-Saharan Africa (4%).

In 2008, Spain granted citizenship to 84,170 persons, mostly to people from Ecuador, Colombia and Morocco. Many foreign residents in Spain also come from other Western and Central European countries. These are mostly British, French, German, Dutch, and Norwegian. They reside primarily on the Mediterranean coast and the Balearic islands, where many are retired or remote workers.

Urbanisation 

Metropolitan areas

Source: "Áreas urbanas +50", Ministry of Public Works and Transport (2013)

Peoples 

The Spanish Constitution of 1978, in its second article, generically recognises contemporary entities—nationalities and regions'— within the context of the Spanish nation.

Spain has been described as a de facto plurinational state. The identity of Spain rather accrues of an overlap of different territorial and ethnolinguistic identities than of a sole Spanish identity. In some cases some of the territorial identities may conflict with the dominant Spanish culture. Distinct traditional identities within Spain include the Basques, Catalans, Galicians, Andalusians and Valencians, although to some extent all of the 17 autonomous communities may claim a distinct local identity.

It is this last feature of "shared identity" between the more local level or autonomous community and the Spanish level which makes the identity question in Spain complex and far from univocal.

 Minority groups 

Spain has a number of descendants of populations from former colonies, especially Latin America and North Africa. Smaller numbers of immigrants from several Sub-Saharan countries have recently been settling in Spain. There are also sizeable numbers of Asian immigrants, most of whom are of Middle Eastern, South Asian and Chinese origin. The single largest group of immigrants are European; represented by large numbers of Romanians, Britons, Germans, French and others.

The arrival of the gitanos (Spanish for "gypsies"), a Romani people, began in the 16th century; estimates of the Spanish Roma population range from 750,000 to over one million.Recent Migration of Roma in Europe, A study by Mr. Claude Cahn and Professor Elspeth Guild , pp. 87–88 (09.2010 figures) There are also the mercheros (also called quinquis), a formerly nomadic minority group. Their origin is unclear.

Historically, Sephardic Jews and Moriscos are the main minority groups originating in Spain and with a contribution to Spanish culture. The Spanish government is offering Spanish nationality to Sephardic Jews.

 Immigration 

According to the official Spanish statistics (INE) there were 5.4 million foreign residents in Spain in 2020 (11.4%) while all citizens born outside of Spain were 7.2 million in 2020, 15.23% of the total population.

According to residence permit data for 2011, more than 860,000 were Romanian, about 770,000 were Moroccan, approximately 390,000 were British, and 360,000 were Ecuadorian. Other sizeable foreign communities are Colombian, Bolivian, German, Italian, Bulgarian, and Chinese. There are more than 200,000 migrants from Sub-Saharan Africa living in Spain, principally Senegaleses and Nigerians. Since 2000, Spain has experienced high population growth as a result of immigration flows, despite a birth rate that is only half the replacement level. This sudden and ongoing inflow of immigrants, particularly those arriving illegally by sea, has caused noticeable social tension.

Within the EU, Spain had the 2nd highest immigration rate in percentage terms after Cyprus, but by a great margin, the highest in absolute numbers, up to 2008. The number of immigrants in Spain had grown up from 500,000 people in 1996 to 5.2 million in 2008 out of a total population of 46 million. In 2005 alone, a regularisation programme increased the legal immigrant population by 700,000 people. There are a number of reasons for the high level of immigration, including Spain's cultural ties with Latin America, its geographical position, the porosity of its borders, the large size of its underground economy and the strength of the agricultural and construction sectors, which demand more low cost labour than can be offered by the national workforce.

Another statistically significant factor is the large number of residents of EU origin typically retiring to Spain's Mediterranean coast. In fact, Spain was Europe's largest absorber of migrants from 2002 to 2007, with its immigrant population more than doubling as 2.5 million people arrived. In 2008, prior to the onset of the economic crisis, the Financial Times reported that Spain was the most favoured destination for Western Europeans considering a move from their own country and seeking jobs elsewhere in the EU.

In 2008, the government instituted a "Plan of Voluntary Return" which encouraged unemployed immigrants from outside the EU to return to their home countries and receive several incentives, including the right to keep their unemployment benefits and transfer whatever they contributed to the Spanish Social Security. The programme had little effect; during its first two months, just 1,400 immigrants took up the offer. What the programme failed to do, the sharp and prolonged economic crisis has done from 2010 to 2011 in that tens of thousands of immigrants have left the country due to lack of jobs. In 2011 alone, more than half a million people left Spain. For the first time in decades the net migration rate was expected to be negative, and nine out of 10 emigrants were foreigners.

 Languages 

Spain is a multilingual state. Spanish—featured in the 1978 Spanish Constitution as castellano ('Castilian')—has effectively been the official language of the entire country since 1931. As allowed in the third article of the Constitution, the other 'Spanish languages' can also become official in their respective autonomous communities. The territoriality created by the form of co-officiality codified in the 1978 Constitution creates an asymmetry, in which Spanish speakers' rights apply to the entire territory whereas vis-à-vis the rest of co-official languages, their speakers' rights only apply in their territories.

Besides Spanish, other territorialized languages include Aragonese, Aranese, Astur-Leonese, Basque, Ceutan Arabic (Darija), Catalan, Galician, Portuguese and Tamazight, to which the Romani Caló and the sign languages may add up. The number of speakers varies widely and their legal recognition is uneven, with some of the most vulnerable languages lacking any sort of effective protection. Those enjoying recognition as official language in some autonomous communities include Catalan (in Catalonia, the Balearic Islands and the Valencian Community, where it is referred to as 'Valencian'); Galician (in Galicia); Basque (in the Basque Country and part of Navarre); and Aranese in Catalonia.

Spanish is natively spoken by 74%, Catalan by 17%, Galician by 7% and Basque by 2% of the Spanish population.

Some of the most spoken foreign languages used by the immigrant communities include Moroccan Arabic, Romanian and English.

 Education 

State education in Spain is free and compulsory from the age of six to sixteen. The current education system is regulated by the 2006 educational law, LOE (Ley Orgánica de Educación), or Fundamental Law for the Education. In 2014, the LOE was partially modified by the newer and controversial LOMCE law (Ley Orgánica para la Mejora de la Calidad Educativa), or Fundamental Law for the Improvement of the Education System, commonly called Ley Wert (Wert Law). Since 1970 to 2014, Spain has had seven different educational laws (LGE, LOECE, LODE, LOGSE, LOPEG, LOE and LOMCE).

The levels of education are preschool education, primary education, secondary education and post-16 education. In regards to the professional development education or the vocational education, there are three levels besides the university degrees: the Formación Profesional Básica (basic vocational education); the Ciclo Formativo de Grado Medio or CFGM (medium level vocation education) which can be studied after studying the secondary education, and the Ciclo Formativo de Grado Superior or CFGS (higher level vocational education), which can be studied after studying the post-16 education level.

The Programme for International Student Assessment coordinated by the OECD currently ranks the overall knowledge and skills of Spanish 15-year-olds as significantly below the OECD average of 493 in reading literacy, mathematics, and science.

 Health 

The health care system of Spain (Spanish National Health System) is considered one of the best in the world, in 7th position in the ranking elaborated by the World Health Organization. The health care is public, universal and free for any legal citizen of Spain. The total health spending is 9.4% of the GDP, slightly above the average of 9.3% of the OECD.

 Religion 

Roman Catholicism, which has a long history in Spain, remains the dominant religion. Although it no longer has official status by law, in all public schools in Spain students have to choose either a religion or ethics class. Catholicism is the religion most commonly taught, although the teaching of Islam, Judaism, and evangelical Christianity is also recognised in law. According to a 2020 study by the Spanish Centre for Sociological Research, about 61% of Spaniards self-identify as Catholics, 3% other faiths, and about 35% identify with no religion. Most Spaniards do not participate regularly in religious services. A 2019 study shows that of the Spaniards who identify themselves as religious, 62% hardly ever or never go to church, 16% go to church some times a year, 7% some time per month and 13% every Sunday or multiple times per week. Recent polls and surveys suggest that around 30% of the Spanish population is irreligious.

The Spanish constitution enshrines secularism in governance, as well as freedom of religion or belief for all, saying that no religion should have a "state character," while allowing for the state to "cooperate" with religious groups.

There have been four Spanish Popes. Damasus I, Calixtus III, Alexander VI and Benedict XIII. Spanish mysticism provided an important intellectual resource against Protestantism with Carmelites like Teresa of Ávila, a reformist nun and John of the Cross, a priest, taking the lead in their reform movement. Later, they became Doctors of the Church. The Society of Jesus was co-founded by Ignatius of Loyola, whose Spiritual Exercises and movement led to the establishment of hundreds of colleges and universities in the world, including 28 in the United States alone. The Society's co-founder, Francis Xavier, was a missionary who reached India and later Japan. In the 1960s, Jesuits Pedro Arrupe and Ignacio Ellacuría supported the movement of Liberation Theology.

Protestant churches have about 1,200,000 members. There are about 105,000 Jehovah's Witnesses. The Church of Jesus Christ of Latter-day Saints has approximately 46,000 adherents in 133 congregations in all regions of the country and has a temple in the Moratalaz District of Madrid.

A study made by the Union of Islamic Communities of Spain demonstrated that there were more than 2,100,000 inhabitants of Muslim background living in Spain , accounting for 4–5% of the total population of Spain. The vast majority was composed of immigrants and descendants originating from the Maghreb (especially Morocco) and other African countries. More than 879,000 (42%) of them had Spanish nationality.

The recent waves of immigration have also led to an increasing number of Muslims, Buddhists, Sikhs and Hindus.
After the Reconquista in 1492, Muslims did not live in Spain for centuries. Their ranks have since been bolstered by recent immigration, especially from Morocco and Algeria.

Judaism was practically non-existent in Spain from the 1492 expulsion until the 19th century, when Jews were again permitted to enter the country. Currently there are around 62,000 Jews in Spain, or 0.14% of the total population. Most are arrivals in the past century, while some are descendants of earlier Spanish Jews. Approximately 80,000 Jews are thought to have lived in Spain prior to its expulsion. However the Jewish Encyclopedia states the number over 800,000 to be too large and 235,000 as too small: 165,000 is given as expelled as possibly too small in favour of 200,000, and the numbers of converts after the 1391 pogroms as less. Other sources suggest 200,000 converts mostly after the pogroms of 1391 and upwards of 100,000 expelled. Descendants of these Sephardic Jews expelled in 1492 are given Spanish nationality if they request it.

 Culture 

Spain is a Western country and one of the major Latin countries of Europe, and a cultural superpower. Spanish culture is marked by strong historic ties to the Catholic Church, which played a pivotal role in the country's formation and subsequent identity. Spanish art, architecture, cuisine, and music have been shaped by successive waves of foreign invaders, as well as by the country's Mediterranean climate and geography. The centuries-long colonial era globalised Spanish language and culture, with Spain also absorbing the cultural and commercial products of its diverse empire.

 World Heritage Sites 

Spain has 47 World Heritage Sites. These include the landscape of Monte Perdido in the Pyrenees, which is shared with France, the Prehistoric Rock Art Sites of the Côa Valley and Siega Verde, which is shared with Portugal, the Heritage of Mercury, shared with Slovenia and the Ancient and Primeval Beech Forests, shared with other countries of Europe. In addition, Spain has also 14 Intangible cultural heritage, or "Human treasures".

 Literature 

Some early examples of vernacular Romance-based literature include short snippets of Mozarabic Romance (such as refrains) sprinkled in Arabic and Hebrew texts. Other examples of early Iberian Romance include the Glosas Emilianenses written in Latin, Basque and Romance.

Early Medieval literature in Christian Iberia was written in Latin, which remained as the standard literary language up until the mid-13th century, whereas Ibero-Romance vernaculars and Basque were spoken. A decisive development ensued in the 13th century in Toledo, where Arabic scholarship was translated to the local vernacular, Castilian. In the scope of lyric poetry Castilian co-existed alongside Galician-Portuguese across the Crown of Castile up until the 16th century. The Romance variety preferred in Eastern Iberia for lyrical poetry, Occitan, became increasingly Catalanised in the 14th and 15th centuries. Major literary works from the Middle Ages include the Cantar de Mio Cid, Tirant lo Blanch, The Book of Good Love and Coplas por la muerte de su padre. Genres such as Mester de Juglaría and Mester de Clerecía were cultivated.

Promoted by the monarchs in the late Middle Ages and even codified in the late 15th century, Castilian (thought to be widespread known as 'Spanish' from the 16th century on) progressively became the language of the power elites in the Iberian Peninsula, further underpinning its prestige as the language of a global empire in the early modern period, which ushered in a Golden era of Castilian literature in the 16th and 17th centuries, also in the science domain, eclipsing Galician and Catalan.

Famous Early Modern works include La Celestina and Lazarillo de Tormes. The famous Don Quijote de La Mancha by Miguel de Cervantes was written in this time. Other writers from the period are: Francisco de Quevedo, Lope de Vega, Calderón de la Barca or Tirso de Molina.

During the Enlightenment we find names such as Leandro Fernández de Moratín, Benito Jerónimo Feijóo, Gaspar Melchor de Jovellanos or Leandro Fernández de Moratín.

Baby steps of Spanish Romantic literature (initially a rebellion against French classicism) have been traced back to the last quarter of the 18th century, even if the movement had its heyday between 1835 and 1850, waning thereafter.

In a broader definition encompassing the period from 1868 or 1874 to 1936, the so-called Silver Age of Spanish Culture ensued.

The waning of Romantic literature was followed by the development of Spanish Realism, which offered depictions of contemporary life and society 'as they were', rather than romanticised or stylised presentations. The major realist writer was Benito Pérez Galdós. The second half of the 19th century also saw the resurgence of the literary use of local languages other than Spanish under cultural movements inspired by Romanticism such as the Catalan Renaixença or the Galician Rexurdimento. Rarely used before in a written medium, the true fostering of the literary use of the Basque language had to wait until the 1960s, even if some interest towards the language had developed in the late 19th century.

20th-century authors were classified in loose literary generations such as the Generation of '98, the Generation of '27, Generation of '36 and the Generation of '50.

Premio Planeta de Novela and Miguel de Cervantes Prize are the two main awards nowadays in Spanish literature.

 Philosophy 

The construct pertaining a distinctive Spanish philosophical thought has been variously approached by academia, either by diachronically tracing its development throughout the centuries from the Roman conquest of Hispania on (with early representatives such as Seneca, Trajan, Lucan, or Martial); by pinpointing its origins to the late 19th century (associated to the Generation of 98); or simply by outright denying its existence. The crux around the existence of a Spanish philosophy pitted the likes of Marcelino Menéndez y Pelayo (chief architect of the myth around it) against Antonio Pérez. Foreign imports such as Krausism proved to be extremely influential in Spain in the 19th and early 20th centuries.

 Art 

Artists from Spain have been highly influential in the development of various European and American artistic movements. Due to historical, geographical and generational diversity, Spanish art has known a great number of influences. The Mediterranean heritage with Greco-Roman and some Moorish and influences in Spain, especially in Andalusia, is still evident today. European influences include Italy, Germany and France, especially during the Renaissance, Spanish Baroque and Neoclassical periods. There are many other autochthonous styles such as the Pre-Romanesque art and architecture, Herrerian architecture or the Isabelline Gothic.

During the Golden Age painters working in Spain included El Greco, José de Ribera, Bartolomé Esteban Murillo and Francisco Zurbarán. Also in the Baroque period, Diego Velázquez created some of the most famous Spanish portraits, such as Las Meninas and Las Hilanderas.

Francisco Goya painted during a historical period that includes the Spanish Independence War, the fights between liberals and absolutists, and the rise of contemporary nations-states.

Joaquín Sorolla is a well-known modern impressionist painter and there are many important Spanish painters belonging to the modernism art movement, including Pablo Picasso, Salvador Dalí, Juan Gris and Joan Miró.

 Sculpture 

The Plateresque style extended from beginnings of the 16th century until the last third of the century and its stylistic influence pervaded the works of all great Spanish artists of the time. Alonso Berruguete (Valladolid School) is called the "Prince of Spanish sculpture". His main works were the upper stalls of the choir of the Cathedral of Toledo, the tomb of Cardinal Tavera in the same Cathedral, and the altarpiece of the Visitation in the church of Santa Úrsula in the same locality. Other notable sculptors were Bartolomé Ordóñez, Diego de Siloé, Juan de Juni and Damián Forment.

There were two Schools of special flair and talent: the Seville School, to which Juan Martínez Montañés belonged, whose most celebrated works are the Crucifix in the Cathedral of Seville, another in Vergara, and a Saint John; and the Granada School, to which Alonso Cano belonged, to whom an Immaculate Conception and a Virgin of Rosary, are attributed.

Other notable Andalusian Baroque sculptors were Pedro de Mena, Pedro Roldán and his daughter Luisa Roldán, Juan de Mesa and Pedro Duque Cornejo. In the 20th century the most important Spanish sculptors were Julio González, Pablo Gargallo, Eduardo Chillida, and Pablo Serrano.

 Cinema 

After the first projection of a cinematographer in Spain by 1896, cinema developed in the following years, with Barcelona becoming the largest production hub in the country (as well as a major European hub) on the eve of the World War I. The conflict offered the Spanish industry of silent films an opportunity for further growth. Local studios for sound films were created in 1932. The government imposition of dubbing of foreign films in 1941 accustomed Spanish audiences to watching dubbed films.

Spanish cinema has achieved major international success including Oscars for recent films such as Pan's Labyrinth and Volver.

As of 2021, the festivals of San Sebastián and Málaga are ranked among the top cultural initiatives in the country.

 Architecture 

Earth and gypsum are very common materials of the traditional vernacular architecture in Spain (particularly in the East of the country, where most of the deposits of gypsum are located).
Due to its historical and geographical diversity, Spanish architecture has drawn from a host of influences. Fine examples of Islamicate architecture, belonging to the Western Islamic tradition, were built in the Middle Ages in places such as Córdoba, Seville, or Granada. Similarly to the Maghreb, stucco decoration in Al-Andalus became an architectural stylemark in the high Middle Ages.

Simultaneously, the Christian kingdoms also developed their own styles; developing a pre-Romanesque style when for a while isolated from contemporary mainstream European architectural influences during the earlier Middle Ages, they later integrated the Romanesque and Gothic streams. There was then an extraordinary flourishing of the Gothic style that resulted in numerous instances being built throughout the entire territory. The so-called Mudéjar style came to designate works by Muslims, Christians and Jews in lands conquered from Muslims.

The arrival of Modernism in the academic arena produced much of the architecture of the 20th century. An influential style centred in Barcelona, known as modernisme, produced a number of important architects, of which Gaudí is one. The International style was led by groups like GATEPAC. Spain is currently experiencing a revolution in contemporary architecture and Spanish architects like Rafael Moneo, Santiago Calatrava, Ricardo Bofill as well as many others have gained worldwide renown.

 Music and dance 

Spanish music is often considered abroad to be synonymous with flamenco, a West Andalusian musical genre, which, contrary to popular belief, is not widespread outside that region. Various regional styles of folk music abound in Aragon, Catalonia, Valencia, Castile, the Basque Country, Galicia, Cantabria and Asturias. Pop, rock, hip hop and heavy metal are also popular.

In the field of classical music, Spain has produced a number of noted composers such as Isaac Albéniz, Manuel de Falla and Enrique Granados and singers and performers such as Plácido Domingo, José Carreras, Montserrat Caballé, Alicia de Larrocha, Alfredo Kraus, Pablo Casals, Ricardo Viñes, José Iturbi, Pablo de Sarasate, Jordi Savall and Teresa Berganza. In Spain there are over forty professional orchestras, including the Orquestra Simfònica de Barcelona, Orquesta Nacional de España and the Orquesta Sinfónica de Madrid. Major opera houses include the Teatro Real, the Gran Teatre del Liceu, Teatro Arriaga and the El Palau de les Arts Reina Sofía.

Thousands of music fans also travel to Spain each year for internationally recognised summer music festivals Sónar which often features the top up and coming pop and techno acts, and Benicàssim which tends to feature alternative rock and dance acts. Both festivals mark Spain as an international music presence and reflect the tastes of young people in the country.
Vitoria-Gasteiz jazz festival is one of the main ones in its genre.

The most popular traditional musical instrument, the guitar, originated in Spain. Typical of the north are the traditional bag pipers or gaiteros, mainly in Asturias and Galicia.

 Cuisine 

Spanish cuisine consists of a great variety of dishes which stem from differences in geography, culture and climate. It is heavily influenced by seafood available from the waters that surround the country, and reflects the country's deep Mediterranean roots. Spain's extensive history with many cultural influences has led to a unique cuisine. In particular, three main divisions are easily identified:Mediterranean Spain – all such coastal regions, from Catalonia to Andalusia – heavy use of seafood, such as pescaíto frito (fried fish); several cold soups like gazpacho; and many rice-based dishes like paella from Valencia and arròs negre (black rice) from Catalonia.Inner Spain – Castile – hot, thick soups such as the bread and garlic-based Castilian soup, along with substantial stews such as cocido madrileño. Food is traditionally conserved by salting, such as Spanish ham, or immersed in olive oil, such as Manchego cheese.Atlantic''' Spain – the whole Northern coast, including Asturian, Basque, Cantabrian and Galician cuisine – vegetable and fish-based stews like caldo gallego and marmitako. Also, the lightly cured lacón ham. The best known cuisine of the northern countries often rely on ocean seafood, as in the Basque-style cod, albacore or anchovy or the Galician octopus-based polbo á feira and shellfish dishes.

 Sport 

While varieties of football have been played in Spain as far back as Roman times, sport in Spain has been dominated by football since the early 20th century. Real Madrid CF and FC Barcelona are two of the most successful football clubs in the world. The country's national football team won the UEFA European Championship in 1964, 2008 and 2012 and the FIFA World Cup in 2010, and is the first team ever to win three back-to-back major international tournaments.

Basketball, tennis, cycling, handball, futsal, motorcycling and, lately, Formula One also can boast of Spanish champions. Today, Spain is a major world sports powerhouse, especially since the 1992 Summer Olympics and Paralympics that were hosted in Barcelona, which stimulated a great deal of interest in sports in the country. The tourism industry has led to an improvement in sports infrastructure, especially for water sports, golf and skiing. In their respective regions, the traditional games of Basque pelota and Valencian pilota both are popular.

 Public holidays and festivals 

Public holidays celebrated in Spain include a mix of religious (Roman Catholic), national and local observances. Each municipality is allowed to declare a maximum of 14 public holidays per year; up to nine of these are chosen by the national government and at least two are chosen locally. Spain's National Day (Fiesta Nacional de España) is celebrated on 12 October, the anniversary of the Discovery of America and commemorate Our Lady of the Pillar feast, patroness of Aragon and throughout Spain.Paloma Aguilar, Carsten Humlebæk, "Collective Memory and National Identity in the Spanish Democracy: The Legacies of Francoism and the Civil War", History & Memory, 1 April 2002, pag. 121–164

There are many festivals and festivities in Spain. Some of them are known worldwide, and millions of tourists from all over the world go to Spain annually to experience one of these festivals. One of the most famous is San Fermín, in Pamplona. While its most famous event is the encierro, or the running of the bulls, which happens at 8:00 am from 7 to 14 July, the seven days-long celebration involves many other traditional and folkloric events. The events were central to the plot of The Sun Also Rises, by Ernest Hemingway, which brought it to the general attention of English-speaking people. As the result, it has become one of the most internationally renowned fiestas in Spain, with over 1,000,000 people attending every year.

Other festivals include: La Tomatina tomato festival in Buñol, Valencia, the carnivals in the Canary Islands, the Falles in Valencia or the Holy Week in Andalusia and Castile and León.

 See also 

 Outline of Spain
 Topographical relief of Spain

 Notes 

 References 

 Works cited 

 

 Further reading 
Carr, Raymond, ed. Spain: a history. Oxford University Press, USA, 2000.
Callaghan O.F Joseph. A History of Medieval Spain Cornell University Press 1983

 External links 

 Spain. The World Factbook. Central Intelligence Agency.
 Spain from UCB Libraries GovPubs''
 
 Spain from the BBC News
 Key Development Forecasts for Spain from International Futures

Government
 E-Government portal for Spain

Maps
 
 

Tourism
 Official tourism portal for Spain

 
Countries in Europe
Iberian Peninsula countries
Member states of NATO
Member states of the European Union
Member states of the Union for the Mediterranean
Member states of the United Nations
Southwestern European countries
Spanish monarchy
Spanish-speaking countries and territories
Countries in Africa
North African countries
Member states of the Council of Europe
States and territories established in 1715
Transcontinental countries
States and territories established in 1978
OECD members